Angolaea is a genus of flowering plants belonging to the family Podostemaceae.

Its native range is Angola.

Species:

Angolaea fluitans

References

Podostemaceae
Malpighiales genera